The Orkney Heritage Society in Orkney, Scotland, is a nonprofit organisation founded in 1968.

It promotes "the beauty, history and character of Orkney" as well as "high standards of architecture and planning" in Orkney. It organizes conferences and grants awards and prizes for writing, historical and architectural projects. It publishes New Orkney Antiquarian Journal as well as a newsletter and other publications. 

Its founder members were:
 Ernest Marwick
 Laura Grimond

Orkney Heritage Society is a registered charity.

See also
Orkney dialect
Orkney lamb
Orkney Single Malts
Orkney vole
Orkney Yole

References

External links
Official website
Orkney Archaeological Trust website
Orkney Iron Age Conference proceedings

1968 establishments in Scotland
Organisations based in Orkney
Charities based in Scotland
Organizations established in 1968
Heritage organisations in Scotland